Arijus Pašakarnys (born October 1, 1997) is a professional Lithuanian basketball player. He plays for small forward position.

References 

Living people
1997 births
Lithuanian men's basketball players
Small forwards
People from Utena